Badger's Green may refer to:

 Badger's Green (play), a play by R.C. Sheriff
 Badger's Green (1934 film), a film adaptation 
 Badger's Green (1938 film), a television adaptation
 Badger's Green (1949 film), a film adaptation